The 39th edition of the annual Vuelta a Venezuela was held from September 3 to September 15, 2002. The stage race started in Puerto Ordaz, and ended in Barquisimeto. There were a total number of 134 competitors, with 69 cyclists actually finishing the stage race.

Stages

2002-09-03: Circuito en Puerto Ordaz (121.5 km)

2002-09-04: Chaguaramas — Santa Bárbara de Tapirín (209.5 km)

2002-09-05: Circuito en Maturin (86 km)

2002-09-06: Santa Bárbara de Tapirín — Guanta (181 km)

2002-09-07: Puerto Piritu — Valle de la Pascua (178 km)

2002-09-08: Circuito en Valle de la Pascua (129 km)

2002-09-09: El Sombrero — San Carlos (202.5 km)

2002-09-10: San Carlos de Austria — San Felipe (228 km)

2002-09-11: Campo Elías — San Felipe (31.5 km)

2002-09-11: Circuito en San Felipe (86.5 km)

2002-09-12: Carora — Cabimas (182.5 km)

2002-09-13: Cabimas — Valera (178 km)

2002-09-14: La Gran Parada — Quibor (148.5 km)

2002-09-15: Circuito Avenue Ribereña, Barquisimeto (120 km)

Final classification

Teams 

Lotería del Táchira A

Cuban National Team

Gobernación del Zulia-Alcaldia de Cabimas A

Gobernación de Trujillo-Café Flor de Patria

Lotería del Táchira B

Gobernación de Anzoátegui

Gobernación del Zulia-Alcaldia de Cabimas B

Kino Táchira

Irdeg Guarico

Alcaldia Tinaco Cojedes

Gobernación de Barinas-Alc Socopo-Lotería Paraiso

Gobernación del Zulia-Alcaldia de Cabimas C

Distribuidora La Japonesa-Lotería Oriente

Dominican Republic National Team

Russian National Team

Que Viva El Huila (Colombia)

Selección Bolívar

México

Alcaldía Caroni Bolivar

Fundadeporte Jesús Torito Romero-Rio Caribe Sucre

Tucán Amazonas

Distribuidora Japonesa-Lotería Oriente TLM Indem

Equipo Mixto

Fundadeporte Carabobo

References 
 Cyclingnews
 Pedalear

Vuelta a Venezuela
Venezuela
Vuelta Venezuela
September 2002 sports events in South America